Abacetus delkeskampi is a species of ground beetle in the subfamily Pterostichinae. It was described by Straneo in 1957.

References

delkeskampi
Beetles described in 1957